Diplasiotherium is an extinct genus of litoptern belonging to the family Proterotheriidae, that lived between the late Miocene and the early Pliocene (in the SALMAs Huayquerian and Montehermosan). The fossils of this animal have been found in Argentina, in the Monte Hermoso Formation.

References

Bibliography 
 
 

Proterotheriids
Miocene mammals of South America
Pliocene mammals of South America
Huayquerian
Montehermosan
Neogene Argentina
Fossils of Argentina
Cerro Azul Formation
Fossil taxa described in 1914
Prehistoric placental genera